Rhabdites is an extinct genus of orthocerids, a kind of straight-shelled nautiloid cephalopod.

References

 Rhabdites -Paleobio database.
 Sepkoski, J.J. Jr. 2002. A compendium of fossil marine animal genera. Bulletins of American Paleontology 363: 1–560. 

Prehistoric nautiloid genera